Antoinette "Nettie" Rogers Shuler  (1862–1939) was an American suffragist and author.

Biography
Shuler née Rogers was born on November 8, 1862 in Buffalo, New York. A graduate of Buffalo Central High School, she married Frank J. Shuler in 1887, with whom she had one child, a daughter named Marjorie who later joined Nettie in her suffrage work.

Shuler was an active suffragist involved with organizing and training suffragists in her home state of New York and throughout the country. She was President of the Western New York Federation of Women's Club's, and was a member and speaker at the National American Woman Suffrage Association (NAWSA). She gave many lectures and addressed various groups and state legislatures, including presenting the case for a suffrage amendment to the New York state legislature. After the passage of the Nineteenth Amendment Shuler collaborated with Carrie Chapman Catt to write the book Woman Suffrage and Politics: The Inner Story of the Suffrage Movement. The book was published in 1923 and traced the history of the women's suffrage in the United States from 1848 through 1920.

Shuler died in New York City on December 2, 1939.

See also
 List of suffragists and suffragettes
 American Woman Suffrage Association

References

Further reading
Woman Suffrage and Politics: The Inner Story of the Suffrage Movement by Carrie Chapman Catt and Nettie Rogers Shuler

External links
 
 

1862 births 
1939 deaths
clubwomen 
American suffragists
Activists from Buffalo, New York
American women writers